Kidane Mihret or Kidane Mehret may refer to:

Churches

Ethiopia
Ura Kidane Mehret, on Zege peninsula
 Kidane Mihret, in Ejersa Goro
 Kidane Mihret, in Mahbere Sillasie
 Kidane Mihret, on Mount Zuqualla
 Kidane Mihret roch church, in Ab'aro, Haddinnet
 Kidane Mihret, near Dabba Hadera monastery
 Kidane Mihret, in Weyname near Bichena
 Kidane Mihret, in Dodola
 Kidane Mihret, in Bure
 Kidane Mihret, in Addi Walka
 Kidane Mihret, in Hagere Selam
 Kidane Mihret, in Emni Ankelalu
 Kidane Mihret, in Nejo
 Kidane Mihret, in Mika'el Abiy
 Kidane Mihret rock church, of Addi Nefas in Abergele

Elsewhere
 Kidane Mehret cathedral, in Asmara, Eritrea
Kidane Mehret Church, Jerusalem, Israel

Other uses
Kidane Mihret River, in Tigray Region, Ethiopia
 Kidane Mehret, a summit known from the Battle of Adwa, Ethiopia